The lesser black whipsnake (Demansia vestigiata) is a species of venomous snake in the family Elapidae.

It is found in the northern parts of Queensland, Northern Territory and Western Australia  in Australia.

References

Demansia
Snakes of Australia
Reptiles described in 1884
Reptiles of Queensland
Reptiles of the Northern Territory
Reptiles of Western Australia